Edge Hill, also known as Green Hills and Walker's Ford Sawmill is a historic home and farm located in Amherst County, Virginia, near Gladstone.  The main house was built in 1833, and is a two-story, brick I-house in the Federal-style.  It has a standing seam metal gable roof and two interior end chimneys.  Attached to the house by a former breezeway enclosed in 1947, is the former overseer's house, built about 1801. Also on the property are the contributing office, pumphouse, corncrib, and log-framed barn all dated to about 1833. Below the bluff, adjacent to the railroad and near the James River, are four additional outbuildings: a sawmill and shed (1865), tobacco barn, and a post and beam two-story cattle barn (c. 1947).  Archaeological sites on the farm include slave quarters, additional outbuildings and a slave cemetery.

It was added to the National Register of Historic Places in 2008.

References

Houses in Amherst County, Virginia
Houses completed in 1833
Federal architecture in Virginia
Houses on the National Register of Historic Places in Virginia
Farms on the National Register of Historic Places in Virginia
National Register of Historic Places in Amherst County, Virginia
Slave cabins and quarters in the United States